USS Wando has been the name of more than one United States Navy ship, and may refer to:

 , a steamer in commission as a gunboat from 1864 to 1865
 , originally Tugboat No. 17, later YT-123, later YTB-123, a tug in commission 1917–1922 and 1933–1946

United States Navy ship names